Melanopsidae, common name melanopsids, is a family of freshwater gastropods in the clade Sorbeoconcha. Species in this family are native to southern and eastern Europe, northern Africa, parts of the Middle East, New Zealand, and freshwater streams of some large South Pacific islands.

These snails first appeared in the Late Cretaceous and are closely related to Potamididae. As well as unidirectional evolutionary change from one species to the next over time, the process of hybridization plays a major role in the appearance of new Melanopsidae species.

According to the taxonomy of the Gastropoda by Bouchet & Rocroi (2005) the family Melanopsidae has no subfamilies.

Genera
Genera in the family Melanopsidae include:
 Esperiana  - synonym: Fagotia Bourguignat, 1884
 Holandriana  - synonym: Amphimelania P. Fischer, 1885
 Holandriana holandrii  or Amphimelania holandrii 
 † Megalonoda 
 Melanopsis  - type genus of the family Melanopsidae
 Microcolpia 
 † Pseudobellardia 
 † Pseudofagotia 
 † Stomatopsis 
 † Stilospirula  - synonyms: Stylospirula Rovereto, 1899
 † Turripontica 
 Zemelanopsis 
 Zemelanopsis trifasciata

References

Further reading
  Glaubrecht M. (1996). Evolutionsökologie und Systematik am Beispiel von Süß- und Brackwasserschnecken (Mollusca: Caenogastropoda: Cerithioidea): Ontogenese-Strategien, Paläontologische Befunde und Zoogeographie. Backhuys, Leiden.
 Thomas A. Neubauer -  "A nomenclator of extant and fossil taxa of the Melanopsidae (Gastropoda, Cerithioidea)" ; 2016, ZooKeys

External links